Anastasia Sergeyevna Samoilenko, née Shlyakhovaya (born  in Zhovtneve) is a Russian volleyball player. She was part of the Russia women's national volleyball team at the 2013 Summer Universiade in Kazan, the Montreux Volley Masters (in 2013, 2014), the FIVB Volleyball World Grand Prix (in 2013, 2014, 2015, 2016), the 2013 Women's European Volleyball Championship in Germany and Switzerland, and the 2016 Summer Olympics in Rio de Janeiro.

At club level, she played for Ufimochka and Omichka before joining Dinamo Krasnodar in 2015.

Personal life
She married basketball player Bogdan Samoilenko in December 2014.

Clubs
  Ufimochka (2007–2013)
  Omichka Omsk (2013–2015)
  Dinamo Krasnodar (2015–2017)
  Dinamo Kazan (2017–2018)

Awards

National team

Junior
 2013 Universiade –  Gold medal

Senior
 2013 Montreux Volley Masters –  Silver medal
 2013 Boris Yeltsin Cup –  Gold medal
 2013 European Championship –  Gold medal
 2014 Montreux Volley Masters –  Bronze medal
 2015 FIVB World Grand Prix –  Silver medal

Clubs
 2014 Russian Cup –  Silver medal (with Omichka Omsk)
 2015 Russian Cup –  Gold medal (with Dinamo Krasnodar)
 2015–16 CEV Cup –  Gold medal (with Dinamo Krasnodar)

References

External links
 Profile  at CEV
 Profile  at Volleyball Club Dinamo Krasnodar

1990 births
Living people
Russian women's volleyball players
Sportspeople from Dnipropetrovsk Oblast
Olympic volleyball players of Russia
Volleyball players at the 2016 Summer Olympics
Universiade medalists in volleyball
Universiade gold medalists for Russia
Medalists at the 2013 Summer Universiade
20th-century Russian women
21st-century Russian women